PPRU-1 "Ovod-M-SV" (GRAU designation - 9S80, NATO reporting name - Dog Ear) is a Soviet/Russian mobile reconnaissance and command center for tactical air defence systems.

Description
PPRU-M1 and PPRU-M1-2 could link up to 3 air defense missile or artillery batteries. It integrates under unified command and control up to 4 vehicles of Tor-M1 (Tor-M2E) or Osa-AKM missile systems, up to 6 vehicles of Tunguska-М1, Strela-10M2 (Strela-10M3) or ZSU-23-4M4 or ZSU-23-4M5, up to 6 guns of ZU-23/-30M1-4, up to 6 sections of Igla and Strela MANPADs and 1 battery of 57-mm S-60 (6–8 anti-aircraft guns).

Modifications
 9S80-1 Sborka (PPRU-1M)
 9S80M Sborka-M
 9S80M1 Sborka-M1 (PPRU-M1)
 9S80M1-2 Sborka-M1-2 (PPRU-M1-2)

See also 
 Ranzhir

External links 
 PPRU-M1 (PPRU-M1-2) at Almaz-Antey website
  Aufklärungs- und Führungsstelle 9S80 (PPRU-1M) SBORKA
  2K22 Tunguska (SA-19 Grison)

Self-propelled anti-aircraft weapons
Self-propelled anti-aircraft weapons of the Soviet Union
Self-propelled anti-aircraft weapons of Russia
Military electronics of Russia